Kofiau is an island in the Raja Ampat Islands, in Southwest Papua, Indonesia. The island is primarily raised coral limestone with some volcanic hills, covered in low forest. The island is home to the endemic Kofiau paradise kingfisher and Kofiau monarch. A new form of the Green tree python has been found on Kofiau and Boo Island that retains its neotenic yellow coloration into adulthood.

References

Raja Ampat Islands